"If Your Heart Ain't Busy Tonight" is a song written by Tom Shapiro and Chris Waters, and recorded by American country music artist Tanya Tucker.  It was released in May 1992 as the fourth single from the album What Do I Do with Me.  The song reached #4 on the Billboard Hot Country Singles & Tracks chart.

Chart performance

Year-end charts

References

1992 singles
Tanya Tucker songs
Songs written by Tom Shapiro
Songs written by Chris Waters
Liberty Records singles
Song recordings produced by Jerry Crutchfield
1991 songs